St. Elizabeths Hospital East and West Cemeteries are two historic cemeteries located on the grounds of St. Elizabeths Hospital.

The West cemetery has burials from the Civil War and hospital patients. Most of the veterans buried in the West Campus cemetery were patients of the hospital and not casualties of the war. A burial ledger of hospital patients between 1917 and 1983 was transcribed and published in 2008.

On the East Campus is the John Howard Cemetery, this cemetery has burials of veterans of multiple conflicts including the Civil War, Spanish–American War, World War I and II, a lone veteran of the War of 1812, and a Black Seminole Scout from the Seminole War.

Access to the cemetery today is controlled by GSA with only authorized persons allowed.

History

 A plaque on a wall of the West cemetery states:

When the West cemetery was considered full by 1873 with a little over 0.7 acres and about 600 graves, plans were drawn up for an East cemetery.  The East cemetery grew over the following 120 years into a nine-acre cemetery, with more than five thousand total burials; over 2,050 military and over 3,000 civilian.

In 2016, a new headstone was added to recognize Medal of Honor recipient Joseph B. Noil, buried in 1882, whose previous headstone has misspelled his surname as Noel and had no acknowledgement of his award.

References

External links 
 Saint Elizabeths Hospital Historic District
 All for the Union: 6th PA Regiment interments at St. Elizabeths
 “Saint Elizabeths Hospital Cemeteries,” DC Historic Sites, accessed September 18, 2022

Cemeteries in Washington, D.C.
1856 establishments in Washington, D.C.